Chelvella Lok Sabha constituency or Chelvella is one of the 17 Lok Sabha (Lower House of the Parliament) constituencies in Telangana state in southern India.

Dr. G. Ranjith Reddy of Telangana Rashtra Samithi is currently representing the constituency for the first time.

History
The constituency came into existence in 2008, following the implementation of delimitation of parliamentary constituencies based on the recommendations of the Delimitation Commission of India constituted in 2002.

Assembly segments
Chevella Lok Sabha constituency comprises the following Legislative Assembly segments:

Members of Parliament

Election results

General Election, 2019

General Election, 2014

General Election, 2009

Trivia
Jaipal Reddy, former Union Minister represented the constituency when it came into existence in 2008.
The constituency includes suburb areas like Madhapur, Gachibowli, Kondapur, Miyapur.

See also
 Rangareddy district
 List of Constituencies of the Lok Sabha

References

External links
 Chevella lok sabha  constituency election 2019 date and schedule

Lok Sabha constituencies in Telangana
Ranga Reddy district